The VMI Keydets wrestling team began in 1921 and represents the Virginia Military Institute of Lexington, Virginia (VMI) as a Member of the Southern Conference (SoCon) of NCAA Division I wrestling. The squad is coached by Jim Gibson.

The VMI wrestling team has had two wrestlers earn All-American honors. Charlie Branch finished in fourth place at 142 lbs at the 1994 NCAA Division I Wrestling Championships. He later served as the head coach of the Eastern Michigan Eagles wrestling team. Leslie Apedoe, a native of Ghana, placed sixth as a heavyweight at the 1999 tournament.

References

 
1921 establishments in Virginia
Sports clubs established in 1921